Jan Ciecierski (8 March 1899 – 20 February 1987) was a Polish actor. He appeared in more than 35 films and television shows between 1938 and 1981.

Selected filmography
 Warsaw Premiere (1951)
 Samson (1961)
 The Orchestra Conductor (1980)

References

External links

1899 births
1987 deaths
Polish male film actors
Male actors from Warsaw